Ashley is a given name which was originally an Old English surname. It is derived from the Old English (Anglo-Saxon) words æsc (ash) and lēah and translates to "Dweller near the ash tree meadow".

Regional variations

Europe 
Ashley was originally a boys' name in England, France and Germany. It was first recorded as a male given name in the 16th century and remained exclusively male until around 350 years later. Its popularity in England came in part from the prominent 17th-century politician Lord Ashley. Appearances of the boys' name in popular culture include Ashley Wilkes in 1939's Gone with the Wind and Ash Williams (Ashley Williams) in the 1981 film The Evil Dead.

Ashley in the United Kingdom remains predominantly male, ranking at #40 in 1996 for boys and staying within the top 100–300 male names given each year. Although Ashley was briefly used for British females, it dropped out of the top UK female name charts in 2011.

United States of America 
In the 1960s, Americans started using the male spelling of Ashley for females as well as males. In the 1980s the name had a rise in popularity attributed to the female soap opera character Ashley Abbott who emerged on the still-running TV series The Young and the Restless in 1982. Spelling variants of the name such as Ashlee, Ashleigh, and Ashlie are also in wide use.

Notable men with this given name
 Ashley Ambrose (born 1970), American football
 Ashley Banjo, English dancer with the dance troupe Diversity.
 Ashley Barnes (born 1989), English footballer playing for Burnley FC
 Ashley Bloomfield, New Zealand public health official
 Ashley Bryan (1923-2022), American writer
 Ashley Buchholz, Canadian musician and member of alternative/dance duo Ubiquitous Synergy Seeker 
 Ashley Cain (footballer) (born 1990), English ex-footballer
 Ashley Callus (born 1979), Australian swimmer
 Ashley Carrington, pseudonym of German writer Rainer M. Schröder
 Ashley Church (born 1964), New Zealand Property commentator
 Ashley Cole (born 1980), English footballer
 Ashley Cooper (tennis) (born 1936), Australian tennis player
 Ashley Fisher (born 1975), Australian tennis player
 Ashley Giles (born 1973), English cricketer
 Ashley Hansen (born 1983), Australian rules footballer
 Ashley Hicks (born 1963), British architect
 Ashley Horne (born 1989), English musician/comedian and member of the group The Midnight Beast
 Ashley Hutchings (born 1945), British folk musician
 Ashley Johnson (rugby union) (born 1986), South African rugby player
 Ashley Leechin, American social media personality and nurse
 Ashley Lelie (born 1980), American football player
 Ashley MacIsaac (born 1975), Canadian professional fiddler
 Ashley McIntosh (born 1972), Australian rules footballer
 Ashley Montagu (1905–1999), British anthropologist and humanist
 Ashley Newbrough (born 1987), American actress
 Ashley Parker Angel (born 1981), American singer, songwriter and actor
 Ashley Purdy (1984), bassist and backing vocalist of the American rock band Black Veil Brides
 Ashley Remington (born 1986), American pro wrestler in Chikara
 Ashley Rice (born 1986), English actor
 Ashley Sampi (born 1983), Australian rules footballer
 Ashley Sexton (born 1987), British professional boxer
 Ashley Sheppard (born 1969), American football player
 Ashley Slater (born 1961), British musician
 Ashley Smith (Australian footballer) (born 1990), Australian rules footballer
 Ash Stymest (Ashley Stymest, born 1991), British model, songwriter
 Ashley Taylor Dawson (born 1982), British actor
 Ashley Theophane (born 1980), British professional boxer
 Ashley Vincent (born 1985), English footballer
 Ashley Wallbridge (born 1988), English DJ, producer and remixer
 Ashley Walters (actor) (born 1982), British actor
 Ashley Walters (artist) (born 1983), South African photographer
 Ashley Ward (born 1970), English footballer
 Ashley Westwood (footballer, born 1976), English footballer and football manager
 Ashley Westwood (footballer, born 1990), English footballer
 Ashley Williams (boxer) (born 1991), Welsh professional soldier and heavyweight boxer
 Ashley Wood (born 1971), Australian comic book and concept artist
 Ashley Young (born 1985), English footballer
 Ashley Zukerman (born 1983), Australian actor

Notable women with this given name
 Ashley (singer) (Ashley Colon; born 1971), Puerto Rican merengue singer
 Ashley Argota (born 1993), American actress
 Ashley Audrain (born 1982), Canadian author
 Ashley Benson (born 1989), American actress
 Ashley Benton, American girl who killed Gabriel Granillo in 2006
 Ashley Biden (born 1981), daughter of the current president of America. Also a social worker, activist, philanthropist, and fashion designer
 Ashley Nicole Black, American comedian
 Ashley Blue (born 1981), American porn star
 Ashley Bouder (born 1983), American ballet dancer
 Ashley C. Bradley, an American screenwriter
 Ashley Brown (soccer) (born 1994), Australian footballer
 Ashley Cariño (born 1994), Puerto Rican-American model and beauty pageant titleholder
 Ashley Dupree (born 1985), American prostitute-turned-sex columnist
 Ashley Eckstein (born 1981), American actress
 Ashley Fliehr (born 1986), American professional wrestler best known as Charlotte Flair
 Ashley Force Hood (born 1982), American drag racer
 Ashley Frangipane (born 1994), known professionally as Halsey, American singer and songwriter
 Ashley Freiberg (born 1991), American racing driver
 Ashley Grace (musician) (born 1987), American singer-songwriter
 Ashley Greene (born 1987), American actress
 Ashley Grossman (born 1993), American water polo player
 Ashley Harkleroad (born 1985), American professional tennis player
 Ashley Henley (1981–2021), American politician
 Ashley Horn, media personality
 Ashley Jensen (born 1969), British actress
 Ashley Johnson (born 1983), American voice actress and singer
 Ashley Judd (born 1968 as Ashley Tyler Ciminella), American actress
 Ashley Leggat (born 1986), Canadian actress
 Ashley Liao (born 2001), American actress
 Ashley Madekwe (born 1983), English actress
 Ashley Massaro (1979–2019), American professional wrestler and model
 Ashley Monroe (born 1986), American singer-songwriter
 Ashley Nee (born 1989), American slalom canoeist
 Ashley Olsen (born 1986), American actress and businesswoman
 Ashley Ortega (born 1998), Filipina actress and professional figure skater
 Ashley Paris (born 1987), American basketball player
 Ashley Peldon (born 1984), American actress
 Ashley Roberts (born 1981), member of The Pussycat Dolls
 Ashley Scott (born 1977), American actress and model
 Ashley Simmons (born 1986), American professional wrestler also known as Ashley Lane and best known as Madison Rayne
 Ashley Slanina-Davies (born 1989), British actress
 Ashley Smith (author) (born 1978), the hostage held by Brian Nichols
 Ashley Spillers (born 1986), American actress
 Ashley Tisdale (born 1985), American singer and actress
 Ashley Wagner (born 1991), American figure skater
 Ashley Whitney (born 1979), American freestyle swimmer
 Ashley Williams (actress) (born 1978), American actress
 Ashley X (born 1997), the pillow angel from Seattle; subject of the Ashley Treatment

Fictional characters
 Ash Williams, protagonist in the Evil Dead film series
 Ashley Abbott, a character in the America soap opera The Young and the Restless
 Ashley Banks, a character in the sitcom The Fresh Prince of Bel-Air
 Ashley Barnstormer, an antagonist in the America web series Video Game High School
 Ashley Barton / Spider-Bitch, a Marvel Comics supervillain
 Ashley Bernitz, an antagonist in the game Ace Combat 5: The Unsung War
 Ashley Graham, a Resident Evil 4 character
 Ashley Hammond, a Power Rangers character
 Ashley Juergens, a character in the teen drama The Secret Life of the American Teenager
 Ash Ketchum, the main character in the Pokémon TV show
 Ashley Kerwin, a character in Canadian drama series Degrassi: The Next Generation
 Ashley Magnus, a character in the science fiction-fantasy series Sanctuary
 Ashley Mizuki Robbins, heroine in the Another Code video game series
 Ashley Peacock, a character from the British soap opera Coronation Street
 Ashley Riot, protagonist in the Vagrant Story video game
 Ashley Spinelli & The Ashleys, characters in the children's television series Recess
 Ashley Thomas, a character in the British soap opera Emmerdale
 Ashley Wilkes, central character in the 1936 novel Gone With the Wind
 Ashley Williams (Mass Effect), female soldier in the Mass Effect video game series named after the Evil Dead character
 Ashley Winchester, the main character of role-playing video game Wild Arms 2
 Ashley, a character in the cartoon series School for Vampires
 Ashley, twin sister of Alissa in the TV series Barney & Friends
 Ashley, a character in the WarioWare series
 Ask Ashley, comedy skit appearing on the Nickelodeon show All That

See also
 Aisling (given name)
 Leigh (disambiguation)
 Lee (given name)
 Lee (English surname)
Ashleigh, a page for people with the given name "Ashleigh"

References

English unisex given names
English masculine given names
English feminine given names
English-language unisex given names
English-language masculine given names
English-language feminine given names
English-language surnames
Unisex given names